Ali's Wedding is a 2017 Australian romantic comedy feature film from Matchbox Pictures. It is directed by Jeffrey Walker and written by Osamah Sami and stars Sami, Helana Sawires, Don Hany and Ryan Corr. Sami has been quoted as saying that the film is "history making, the first Muslim rom-com. This movie will hopefully pave the way for many other similar stories, not just from the Muslim community but from other communities and other minorities in our society." He said that the "affectionate and poignant story of love" was trying to cast a more positive light on Muslim-Australian life.

Plot 
Ali (Osamah Sami), the charming and musically-talented son of an Iraqi Shia cleric (Don Hany), struggles to make the right life choices despite the best of intentions. He wants to be with the girl, Dianne (Helana Sawires), he loves, but he's been promised to another girl at his father's mosque. He wants to be the great doctor that the community expects him to be, but he doesn't get the marks. Above all, he wants to make his father proud.

To live up to these impossible expectations, he lies about his academic achievements, and then his quest to please his father spirals out of control, with amusing and poignant consequences.

Cast 
Osamah Sami as Ali Albasri
Don Hany as Sheik Mahdi
Helana Sawires as Dianne Mohsen
Frances Duca as Zahra
Khaled Khalafalla as Moe Greene
Asal Shenavehzadeh as Ramona
Majid Shokor as Seyyed Ghaffar
Shayan Salehian as Luay
Ghazi Alkinani as Abu Faisal
Rodney Afif as Haj Karim
Maha Wilson as Yomna
Natalie Gamsu as Fatima
Robert Rabiah as Mohsen
Rahel Romahn as Ayoob
Aljin Abella as Chris
Ryan Corr as Wazza
Jaafar Allamy as Jamal Al Hilfi

Release
Ali's Wedding premiered at the Adelaide Film Festival in October 2016. It also showed at the Sydney Film Festival on 8 June 2017.

Reception
On review aggregator Rotten Tomatoes, the film holds an approval rating of 92% based on 26 reviews, with an average rating of 7/10. The website's critics consensus reads: "Ali's Wedding uses its very specific setting to explore universal ideas about relationships -- and in delightfully smart, funny fashion." On Metacritic, the film has a weighted average score of 64 out of 100, based on 4 critics, indicating "generally favorable reviews".

Music
 see Ali's Wedding (soundtrack)

Accolades

References

External links
 Ali's Wedding official website
 

2016 films
Australian romantic comedy-drama films
Films set in Melbourne
Films shot in Melbourne
Films based on biographies
Films based on works by Australian writers
Islamic comedy and humor
Films scored by Nigel Westlake
2016 romantic comedy-drama films
2016 comedy films
2016 drama films
2010s English-language films